The Information School or iSchool of the University of Sheffield, in Sheffield, South Yorkshire, England, was founded in 1963 as the University's Postgraduate School of Librarianship and became in 2010 the first UK iSchool. The School is ranked Number One in the World for Library and Information Management.  Other names were the Postgraduate School of Librarianship and Information Science (PGSLIS, 1967–81) and Department of Information Studies (1981-2011). , it employs 33 academic staff, 16 administrative/support staff, 6 affiliated research staff, and has about 65 research students. The current head of school is Professor Val Gillet.

The department opened in 1964 as a library school, becoming only the second university-based department in the UK. Since then, like many information science departments it has grown to encompass teaching and research in cheminformatics, educational informatics, health informatics, information retrieval, information systems, knowledge and information management, as well as libraries and information society. Such is the status of the school, that it has twice been honoured with a special issue of the Journal of Information Science devoted entirely to the department, its staff and its research outputs.

Research achievements
The School is Number One in the World for Library and Information Studies in the QS World University Rankings 2021. The school has ranked highest or joint highest in its subject rating in every Research Assessment Exercise since the running of the first exercise in 1986. In this UK-government sponsored assessment of research outputs, no other department in its subject field (or its University) achieved this consistency; few departments of any subject area in UK universities managed such a high level of continuous research output (see the following links to the 1992, 1996, 2001 RAE results). In 2008, rankings of departments was left to news organizations; the Times Higher Education placed Sheffield at No. 1 again.

In 2008, an analysis of citations showed four of the ten most cited UK information studies academics were working in the Sheffield department. It is also the first UK-based (and 2nd European) department to become an iSchool.

Notable staff, past and present
 Micheline Beaulieu - Chair of the Computing and Informatics Panel of the European Research Council (2008-2011)
 Sheila Corrall - first President of Chartered Institute of Library and Information Professionals (CILIP), 2002-3:.
 Michael Lynch, chemoinformatics specialist
 Wilfred Saunders, Founding Director of the Postgraduate School of Librarianship, Sheffield
 Bob Usherwood - President of the Library Association, 1998; fellow of the Royal Society of Arts.
 Steve Whittaker - inducted into the SIGCHI academy in 2008.
 Paul Clough - Head of Information Retrieval Research Group 
 Peter Willett - leading researcher in cheminformatics.
 Tom Wilson - recipient of the 2009 ASIS&T SIG USE award for "outstanding contributions to information behavior" and Association for Information Science and Technology (ASIS&T) Award of Merit, 2017.

Notable alumni
 Michael Buckland - Emeritus Professor at the University of California—Berkeley School of Information and Co-Director of the Electronic Cultural Atlas Initiative
 John McTernan - Director of Political Operations at 10 Downing Street under Tony Blair.
 Alasdair Paterson - poet, winner of the 1975 Eric Gregory Award for poetry.
Hatoon Kadi - Saudi Arabian comedian and activist who hosts the Noon Al Niswa comedy show on YouTube.

References

Further reading
Saunders, W. L., ed. University and Research Library Studies: some contributions from the University of Sheffield Post-graduate School of Librarianship and Information Science. Oxford: Pergamon Press, 1968

External links
 University of Sheffield Information School home page

University of Sheffield
Information schools
Library science education